The 2018 Korea Open (officially known as the Victor Korea Open 2018 for sponsorship reasons) was a badminton tournament that took place at the SK Handball Stadium in Seoul, South Korea, from 25 to 30 September 2018 and had a total prize of $600,000.

Tournament
The 2018 Korea Open was the eighteenth tournament of the 2018 BWF World Tour and also part of the Korea Open championships, which has been held since 1991. This tournament was organized by the Badminton Korea Association and sanctioned by the BWF.

Venue
This international tournament was held at the SK Handball Stadium in Seoul, South Korea.

Point distribution
Below is the point distribution table for each phase of the tournament based on the BWF points system for the BWF World Tour Super 500 event.

Prize money
The total prize money for this tournament was US$600,000. Distribution of prize money was in accordance with BWF regulations.

Men's singles

Seeds

 Viktor Axelsen (second round)
 Kento Momota (quarter-finals)
 Son Wan-ho (second round)
 Chou Tien-chen (champion)
 Srikanth Kidambi (withdrew)
 Kenta Nishimoto (semi-finals)
 Anthony Sinisuka Ginting (quarter-finals)
 Tommy Sugiarto (final)

Finals

Top half

Section 1

Section 2

Bottom half

Section 3

Section 4

Women's singles

Seeds

 Akane Yamaguchi (semi-finals)
 Ratchanok Intanon (second round)
 Nozomi Okuhara (champion)
 Sung Ji-hyun (semi-finals)
 Saina Nehwal (quarter-finals)
 Zhang Beiwen (final)
 Sayaka Takahashi (quarter-finals)
 Gao Fangjie (quarter-finals)

Finals

Top half

Section 1

Section 2

Bottom half

Section 3

Section 4

Men's doubles

Seeds

 Takeshi Kamura / Keigo Sonoda (second round)
 Mathias Boe / Carsten Mogensen (withdrew)
 Mads Conrad-Petersen / Mads Pieler Kolding (first round)
 Takuto Inoue / Yuki Kaneko (quarter-finals)
 Kim Astrup / Anders Skaarup Rasmussen (first round)
 Chen Hung-ling / Wang Chi-lin (second round)
 Liao Min-chun / Su Cheng-heng (second round)
 Hiroyuki Endo / Yuta Watanabe (champions)

Finals

Top half

Section 1

Section 2

Bottom half

Section 3

Section 4

Women's doubles

Seeds

 Yuki Fukushima / Sayaka Hirota (final)
 Misaki Matsutomo / Ayaka Takahashi (champions)
 Greysia Polii / Apriyani Rahayu (withdrew)
 Shiho Tanaka / Koharu Yonemoto (semi-finals)
 Lee So-hee / Shin Seung-chan (first round)
 Mayu Matsumoto / Wakana Nagahara (quarter-finals)
 Della Destiara Haris / Rizki Amelia Pradipta (second round)
 Du Yue / Li Yinhui (quarter-finals)

Finals

Top half

Section 1

Section 2

Bottom half

Section 3

Section 4

Mixed doubles

Seeds

 Zheng Siwei / Huang Yaqiong (first round)
 Mathias Christiansen / Christinna Pedersen (final)
 Chris Adcock / Gabrielle Adcock (second round)
 Hafiz Faizal / Gloria Emanuelle Widjaja  (quarter-finals)
 He Jiting / Du Yue (champions)
 Wang Chi-lin / Lee Chia-hsin (second round)
 Yuta Watanabe / Arisa Higashino (quarter-finals)
 Dechapol Puavaranukroh / Sapsiree Taerattanachai (semi-finals)

Finals

Top half

Section 1

Section 2

Bottom half

Section 3

Section 4

References

External links
 Tournament Link

Korea Open (badminton)
Korea Open (badminton)
Korea Open (badminton)
Korea Open (badminton)